{{DISPLAYTITLE:C21H22O11}}

The molecular formula C21H22O11 (molar mass: 450.39 g/mol, exact mass: 450.116212) may refer to:
 Astilbin, a flavanonol
 Marein, an aurone
 Smitilbin, a flavanonol